In phonetics, alveolo-palatal (alveolopalatal, alveo-palatal or alveopalatal) consonants, sometimes synonymous with pre-palatal consonants, are intermediate in articulation between the coronal and dorsal consonants, or which have simultaneous alveolar and palatal articulation. In the official IPA chart, alveolo-palatals would appear between the retroflex and palatal consonants but for "lack of space". Ladefoged and Maddieson characterize the alveolo-palatals as palatalized postalveolars (palato-alveolars), articulated with the blade of the tongue behind the alveolar ridge and the body of the tongue raised toward the palate, whereas Esling describes them as advanced palatals (pre-palatals), the furthest front of the dorsal consonants, articulated with the body of the tongue approaching the alveolar ridge. These descriptions are essentially equivalent, since the contact includes both the blade and body (but not the tip) of the tongue (see schematic at right). They are front enough that the fricatives and affricates are sibilants, the only sibilants among the dorsal consonants.

According to Daniel Recasens, alveolo-palatal consonants are realized through the formation of a simultaneous closure or constriction at the alveolar and palatal zones with a primary articulator which encompasses the blade and the tongue dorsum. Their place of articulation may include the postalveolar zone and the prepalate, but also a larger contact area extending towards the front alveolar zone and the back palate surface. The tongue tip is bent downwards and the tongue dorsum is raised and fronted during the production of these consonants.

Sibilants 
The alveolo-palatal sibilants are often used in varieties of Chinese such as Mandarin, Hakka, and Wu, as well as other East Asian languages such as Japanese and Korean, Tibeto-Burman such as Tibetan and Burmese as well as Tai languages such as Thai, Lao, Shan and Zhuang. Alveolo-palatal sibilants are also a feature of many Slavic languages, such as Polish, Russian, and Serbo-Croatian, and of Northwest Caucasian languages, such as Abkhaz and Ubykh. The alveolo-palatal consonants included in the International Phonetic Alphabet are:

Stops, nasals, and liquids 
Symbols for alveolo-palatal stops, nasals and liquids are sometimes used in sinological circles (a circumflex accent is also sometimes seen), but they are not recognized by the IPA. They may be simple palatal or palatalized consonants, classified as alveolo-palatals because they pattern with the alveolo-palatal sibilants of the language rather than because they are alveolo-palatal in articulation.

For example, the Polish nasal represented with the letter ń is a palatalized laminal alveolar nasal and thus often described as alveolo-palatal rather than palatal. The "palatal" consonants of Indigenous Australian languages are also often closer to alveolo-palatal in their articulation.

Contrasting with palatovelar consonants
In Migueleño Chiquitano, phoneme /ȶ/ contrasts with phoneme /c̠/; in conservative Irish, laminal alveolo-palatal phoneme /ṉʲ/ contrasts with both dorsal palatal phoneme /ɲ/ and apical palatalized alveolar phoneme /nʲ/. In both cases, the palatal consonants work as the palatalization of velar consonants while alveolo-palatal consonants work as the palatalization of alveolar consonants.

References

Further reading

Place of articulation